This is a list of ministries of the Government of Uruguay.

See also 
 Cabinet of Uruguay

Ministries